Willie Smith (born 20 September 1977) is a retired Namibian athlete who specialised in the 400 metres hurdles. He represented his country at the 2000 Summer Olympics failing to qualify for the semifinals.

His personal best of 49.05 (2001) is the current national record.

Competition record

References

1977 births
Living people
Namibian male hurdlers
Athletes (track and field) at the 2000 Summer Olympics
Athletes (track and field) at the 2002 Commonwealth Games
Olympic athletes of Namibia
Commonwealth Games competitors for Namibia
World Athletics Championships athletes for Namibia
20th-century Namibian people
21st-century Namibian people